East Aleppo offensive may refer to:
 East Aleppo offensive (2015–2016)
 East Aleppo offensive (February–April 2017)
 East Aleppo offensive (May 2017)